Mohammed Suhail Chinya Salimpasha (born Jan 20, 2001), currently founder of 1618 Finance, is an Indian malnutrition researcher and inventor from Mangalore, Karnataka. He is known for his award-winning research on "early diagnosis of" Protein Energy Malnutrition.

Suhail developed a saliva-based colorimetric test for rapid quantification of nutrition status in children and establishing personalised nutrition plans.

He also developed a non-invasive saliva-based colorimetric using inexpensive tools such as paper for early diagnosis of malnutrition.

Early life 
Suhail is the son of Salim Pasha and Parveen. He was homeschooled and for a brief time schooled at St.Aloysius Pre-University College.

Recognition 
 Pradhan Mantri Bal Puraskar for his work in Protein Energy Malnutrition (2019)
 2nd Grand Award at Intel International Science & Engineering Fair (2018).
 Minor planet, MOHAMMEDSUHAIL-34491, was named for him by MIT Lincoln Laboratory under the Ceres Connection Program.

References 

Living people
Indian medical researchers
2001 births
People from Karnataka
21st-century Indian inventors